Anisophyllea nitida is a tree of Borneo in the family Anisophylleaceae. The specific epithet  is from the Latin meaning "polished", referring to the shiny appearance of the upper leaf surface.

Description
The bark is smooth to scaly.

Distribution and habitat
Anisophyllea nitida is endemic to Borneo. Its habitat is dipterocarp forests.

References

nitida
Trees of Borneo
Endemic flora of Borneo
Plants described in 1993
Taxonomy articles created by Polbot
Flora of the Borneo lowland rain forests